Zaleszany  is a village in Stalowa Wola County, Subcarpathian Voivodeship, in south-eastern Poland. It is the seat of the gmina (administrative district) called Gmina Zaleszany.

The village has a population of 1,000.

Poet and soldier Józef Mączka was born here.

References

Villages in Stalowa Wola County